"Cruiser" is a song by American new wave band The Cars, from their 1981 album Shake It Up.

Background
"Cruiser" was written by Cars songwriter and vocalist Ric Ocasek and sung by bassist-vocalist Benjamin Orr.

Upon the release of Shake It Up, "Cruiser" was singled out for some praise. The Bangor Daily News, in an otherwise unenthusiastic review of Shake It Up, cited "Cruiser" as a source of "real excitement". AllMusic reviewer Greg Prato describes the song as "rocking" and a highlight of the album.  On the other hand, AllMusic critic Tim Sendra describes the song as "a pale version of a rocker from either of the first two albums." Daily Record critic Jim Bohen describes how drummer David Robinson "pounds his drums over the beat of the rhythm machine" to generate "dance floor dynamics."

In addition to appearing on the album, "Cruiser" was released as the B-side of the single "Shake It Up". "Cruiser" was also included in the 1995 Cars compilation Just What I Needed: The Cars Anthology. Prato describes the song as a highlight of the anthology.

Live versions of the song appeared in the VHS release The Cars Live 1984–1985 and the CD/DVD release The Cars Unlocked.

Reception
"Cruiser" became a minor rock radio hit on its own. It reached number 37 on Billboard Top Tracks chart in 1982.  Along with "Shake It Up" it reached #14 on the Billboard Dance Club Songs chart.  Boston Globe critic Steve Morse praised "Cruiser" as a highlight of Shake It Up and an exception from the "absence of spirit" of the album.

Chart performance

References

The Cars songs
1981 songs
Songs written by Ric Ocasek
Song recordings produced by Roy Thomas Baker